Miroslav Perković (born 15 March 2001) is a Montenegrin water polo player.  He competed in the 2020 Summer Olympics.

References

2001 births
Living people
People from Kotor
Water polo players at the 2020 Summer Olympics
Montenegrin male water polo players
Olympic water polo players of Montenegro